Robert Winslow Gordon (September 2, 1888 – March 26, 1961) was an American academic, known as a collector of folk songs.

Gordon was educated at Harvard University. He joined the English faculty at the University of California at Berkeley in 1918. In 1923, he was asked by Arthur Sullivant Hoffman to run the folk music column "Old Songs Men Have Sung" in Hoffman's magazine, Adventure. Gordon accepted and used the Adventure column to collect information on traditional American music from the magazine's readers.

Gordon was the founding head of the Archive of American Folk Song (later the Archive of Folk Culture, which became part of the American Folklife Center) at the Library of Congress in 1928. He was a pioneer in using mechanical means to document folk musicians, originally using Edison cylinder recordings. He is known among folk singers as the originator of the Gordon "Inferno" Collection of American songs; he also collected an early version of Kumbaya.

From 1943 to 1958, Gordon was a Professor of English at George Washington University. He died March 26, 1961.

References 

 Folk-Songs of America: The Robert Winslow Gordon Collection, 1922-1932
 "Robert W. Gordon collection, ca. 1906-1939". University of Oregon Libraries Special Collections & University Archives: Archives West. Retrieved April 21, 2017.

Biography 

1888 births
1961 deaths
Harvard University alumni
University of California, Berkeley College of Letters and Science faculty
American folk-song collectors
American folklorists
People from Bangor, Maine
George Washington University faculty